Depth(s) may refer to:

Science and mathematics 
 Three-dimensional space
 Depth (ring theory), an important invariant of rings and modules in commutative and homological algebra
 Depth in a well, the measurement between two points in an oil well
 Color depth (or "number of bits" or "bit depth"), in computer graphics
 Market depth, in financial markets, the size of an order needed to move the market a given amount
 Moulded depth, a nautical measurement
 Sequence depth, or coverage, in genetic sequencing
 Depth (coordinate), a type of vertical distance
Tree depth

Art and entertainment 
 Depth (video game), an asymmetrical multiplayer video game for Microsoft Windows
 Depths (novel), a 2004 novel by Henning Mankell
 Depths (Oceano album), 2009
 Depths (Windy & Carl album), 1998
 "Depths" (Law & Order: Criminal Intent), an episode of Law & Order: Criminal Intent
 Depth, the Japanese title for the PlayStation game released in Europe under the name Fluid

See also 
 
 
 Altitude, height, and depth (ISO definitions)
 Altitude
 Depth charge (disambiguation)
 Depth perception, the visual ability to perceive the world in three dimensions (3D)
 Fluid pressure
 Plumb-bob
 Sea level
 Deep (disambiguation)